Massimo Dapporto (born 8 August 1945) is an Italian actor and voice actor.

Biography
Born in Milan, the son of the actor and comedian Carlo Dapporto, he studied acting at the Silvio D'Amico National Academy of Dramatic Arts. Dapporto began his career in the 1970s and found professional opportunities in the small screen, where he starred in TV-series and mini-series of great success, notably the medical drama Amico mio and he even played the role of Emperor Claudius in the Imperium movie Nero.

In 1989, he won a David di Donatello for best supporting actor for his performance in Francesca Archibugi's Mignon Has Come to Stay.

In his profession as a voice actor, Dapporto dubbed characters into the Italian language. He served as the Italian voice of Buzz Lightyear in the Toy Story films as well as dubbing Tim Curry, Michael Keaton, John Goodman, Pierre Arditi, Patrick Stewart, Joe Mantegna and Cheech Marin in some of their movies.

Personal life
Dapporto is the father of director Davide Dapporto. He has also been married to Stefania Longo since 1971. He considers himself Catholic but he believes in reincarnation.

Filmography

Cinema
 Il trafficone (1974)
 Goodnight, Ladies and Gentlemen (1976) 
 Nerone (1976)
 Hunted City (1979)
 Soldati - 365 all'alba (1987)
  (1987) 
  (1987)
 The Family (1987)
 Mignon Has Come to Stay (1988)
  (1989)
 Rouge Venise (1989)
 Tre colonne in cronaca (1990)
  (1990)
 Traces of an Amorous Life (1990)
  (1991)
 A Simple Story (1991)
  (1992)
 Per non dimenticare (1992)
 State Secret (1995)
 Marching in Darkness (1996)
 Celluloide (1996)
 Anni Ribelli (1996)
  (1997)
 L'apparenza (2003)
  (2006)

Television
 All'ultimo minuto (1973) 
  (1974) 
  (1978) 
 Il mercante di Venezia (1979)
  (1981) 
  (1982) 
  (1983) 
 Mussolini and I (1985) 
  (1986) 
  (1987) 
  (1990)
  (1991) 
 Una madre come tu (1993) 
 Amico mio (1993–1998) 
  (1995) 
  (1997) 
 Un prete tra noi (1997–1999) 
  (1999) 
 Ciao professore (1999) 
  (2001)
 Casa famiglia (2001–2003) 
 Il commissario (2002) 
 Nero (2004) 
  (2006) 
 Distretto di Polizia (2007) 
  (2012) 
  (2013)
  (2016)

Dubbing roles

Animation
Buzz Lightyear in Toy Story
Buzz Lightyear / Utility Belt Buzz in Toy Story 2
Buzz Lightyear in Toy Story 3
Buzz Lightyear in Toy Story 4
Buzz Lightyear in Buzz Lightyear of Star Command: The Adventure Begins
Buzz Lightyear in Toy Story of Terror!
Buzz Lightyear in Hawaiian Vacation
Buzz Lightyear in Small Fry
Buzz Light Car in Cars
Shaggy Rogers in Scooby-Doo (2nd voice)
Warren T. Rat in An American Tail
Heathcliff in Heathcliff

Live action
Mr. Hector in Home Alone 2: Lost in New York
Walter Garfield in The Monuments Men
Bill Blazejowski in Night Shift
Stan Starkey in Maid to Order
Cheech Marin in Cheech and Chong's Next Movie
Jean Passepartout in Around the World in 80 Days
Maitre d' at L'Idiot in L.A. Story
Quon in One of Our Dinosaurs Is Missing
Joe Gipp in Adventures in Babysitting

References

External links 

1945 births
Living people
Male actors from Milan
Italian male stage actors
Italian male film actors
Italian male television actors
Italian male voice actors
David di Donatello winners
Ciak d'oro winners
Accademia Nazionale di Arte Drammatica Silvio D'Amico alumni
20th-century Italian male actors
21st-century Italian male actors
Italian Roman Catholics